Thins is one of the largest brands of savoury snack potato chips released in Australia and is owned by Snack Brands Australia. The snack food is a thinly-sliced variety of potato chip (crisp) and comes in a variety of flavours, including Chicken, Original, Salt & Vinegar, "BBQ Ribs", "Cheese & Onion", Sour Cream & Chives" and Light & Tangy. It competes chiefly with Smith's Thinly Cut, another thinly sliced potato chip (crisp), along with various crinkle cut brands.

The Thins brand has undergone several ownership changes throughout its history. Originally owned by Arnott's, the brand was sold to The Smith's Snackfood Company shortly after Arnott's was bought by the Campbell Soup Company in a hostile takeover bid in 1997. Smith's, in turn, was purchased by PepsiCo and began to re-label the Thins brand jointly with Pepsi's own brand of thin potato chips, Lay's. It was sold under the moniker Thins: now known internationally as Lay's. Smith's later sold Thins to Snack Foods Limited but continued to produce its own line of potato chips under the Lay's brand name. For a while, there were two competing lines of potato chips released in Australia that were effectively the same product and even shared similar packaging since the Thins packet design was based on the Lay's packaging in North America. In 2002, Snack Foods Limited was purchased by Arnott's, and the Thins brand was returned to the company that created it. Smith's produced a line of potato chips under the Lay's brand for a brief period until it was eventually rebranded as Smith's Crisps (now Smith's Thinly Cut), and the traditional Smith's line was renamed Smith's Crinkle Cut. Thins is still sold in Australia as a direct competitor to Smith's Chips.

References

External links
 Thins Website

Snack Brands Australia brands
Brand name potato chips and crisps